StarTran is the public transit bus system in Lincoln, Nebraska, United States. It operates 18 regular bus routes and a downtown circulator service on weekdays from 5:15 a.m. to 9:55 p.m. and Saturdays from 5:55 a.m. to 7:05 p.m. There is no service on Sundays. There is a special Handi-Van transportation service for those who have a disability that prevents them from riding a regular city bus.

Environmental
During the summer of 2014, StarTran received 5 New Flyer CNG buses that currently operate on routes 24 Holdrege and 25 Vine. StarTran is due to receive several more during 2015 and convert a third of the fleet to CNG by 2016. The other vehicles in the fleet continue to run off Soy Biodiesel.

Statistics
StarTran's 2005-2006 annual operating budget was $8,585,826, 65.75% of which was funded through the city, 16.64% from user fees, 16.06% federally, and 1.55% through the state of Nebraska.  The total ridership for StarTran in the 2005-2006 year was 1,826,289 riders.  StarTran's nearly 70 full-size coaches and handi-vans traveled 1,740,148 miles in the 2005-2006 year.

Ridership in 2004-2005 was 1,648,744, 97% of which were riders on fixed routes.  1,715,530 collective revenue miles were traveled by the fleet in the same year, 82.02% of which were on fixed routes.

In August 2012, StarTran announced it had 2 million rides for the 2011-2012 fiscal year, for the first time in 20 years.

2013-2015 
StarTran traveled 1,857,689 revenue miles in the 2013-14 fiscal year and provided 2,495,206 rides. The annual operating budget for the 2014-15 fiscal year is $12,252,632.

2015-2016 
StarTran had a budget of $13,067,600 for fiscal year 2015-2016.

Route list
13 South 13th
14 West Van Dorn
22 NIC City
23 NIC East
24 Holdrege
25 Vine
27 North 27th
40 Heart Hospital
41 Havelock
42 Bethany
44 O Street
46 Arnold Heights
48/54 Veteran's Hospital/North 48th (Interlined Route)
49 University Place
51 West A
52 Gaslight
53 SouthPointe
55 Star Shuttle
56 Sheridan

Former routes
1 Havelock (eliminated on June 5, 2008 during bus route redesign; replaced by route 42, route 49, and route 41)
2 Bethany (eliminated on June 5, 2008 during bus route redesign; replaced by route 42 and route 49)
3 College View (eliminated on June 5, 2008 during bus route redesign; partially replaced by route 50)
4 University Place (eliminated on June 5, 2008 during bus route redesign; replaced by routes 41, 42, and 49)
5 Bryan/Trendwood (eliminated on June 5, 2008 during bus route redesign; replaced by routes 40 and 43)
6 Arapahoe (eliminated on June 5, 2008 during bus route redesign; replaced by routes 48 and 45)
7 Belmont (renumbered route 47 on June 5, 2008 and directional splits eliminated due to bus route redesign)
8 Veteran's Hospital (eliminated on June 5, 2008 during bus route redesign; partially replaced by routes 43 and 54)
9 O Street Shuttle (renumbered route 44 on June 5, 2008 during bus route redesign, with reroutings to replace part of route 10)
10 East Vine (eliminated on June 5, 2008 during bus route redesign; partially replaced by routes 42 and 44)
11 Gaslight Village (had some rerouting on the south end and was renumbered route 52 on June 5, 2008 due to bus route redesign)
12 Arnold Heights (renumbered route 46 on June 5, 2008 due to bus route redesign)
13 Normal (eliminated on June 5, 2008 during bus route redesign; partially replaced by routes 50 and 43)
14 Crosstown (eliminated in winter 2000; replaced by then-new route 18 Midtown)
15 Eastridge (eliminated on June 5, 2008 during bus route redesign; partially replaced by routes 40, 43, and 54)
16 Irving (eliminated on June 5, 2008 during bus route redesign; partially replaced by routes 45 and 53)
17x West A Express (slight rerouting on the west end and renumbered route 51 on June 5, 2008 during bus route redesign)
18 Midtown (renamed 18 48th Street Shuttle on October 18, 2001)
18 48th Street Shuttle (eliminated on June 5, 2008 during bus route redesign; partially replaced by routes 50, 40, 43, 54, and 41)
19 Salt Valley (eliminated on June 5, 2008 during bus route redesign; partially replaced by routes 45 and 48)
20x Northeast Limited Express (eliminated in winter 2000)
21x Colonial Hills Express (eliminated in winter 2000)
22x Southern Heights Express (eliminated in winter 2000)
23x Eastside Express (eliminated in winter 2000)
27x Southeast Express (converted to local and renamed 27 27th Street Shuttle in winter 2000)
27 27th Street Shuttle (eliminated on June 5, 2008 during bus route redesign; partially replaced by routes 50, 45, 53, 42, 49, and 41)
43 Normal (eliminated on October 3, 2016 due to new bus system; replaced by realigned route 40 and realigned route 53)
45 Arapahoe (eliminated on October 3, 2016 due to new bus system; replaced by then-new route 13 and then-new route 56)
47 Belmont (eliminated on October 3, 2016 due to new bus system; replaced by realigned route 41 and then-new route 27)
48 Salt Valley (eliminated on October 3, 2016 due to new bus system; replaced by then-new route 13 and then-new route 56)
50 College View (eliminated on October 3, 2016 due to new bus system; replaced by realigned route 54 (which became route 48/54 that day), realigned route 40, then-new route 56, and realigned route 53)
56 Neighborhood North
57 Neighborhood South

Fares
StarTran has a variety of fare payment methods. Fares may be paid while boarding or passes may be purchased before boarding. Children under 4 years old ride free. Transfers are free. Passes may be purchased at the StarTran 710 "J" Street, at a retail outlet, or using the Token Transit mobile ticketing app.

Additionally, the following pass types are available:
 31 Consecutive Day Pass: $17.00. Low Income available for $8.00, Handi-van for $34.00 and Low Income Handi-Van for $16.00
 20 Ride Pass: $33.00. Handi-Van 20 Ride Pass available for $66.00.
 Senior Saver/Go For Less 20 Ride Pass: $16.00.
 Star Pass - Summer Youth Bus Pass: $20.00.

Incidents

2013 passenger assault
A 43-year-old StarTran bus driver was fired after physically assaulting a 40-year-old passenger on 23 March 2013 for "asking too many questions."  The white driver beat a black passenger, hitting him at least 18 times before dragging him off the bus and throwing him into 84th Street in Lincoln.  The incident garnered national media mention, and a video of the incident went viral online.

Troy Fischer was found guilty of third degree assault in July 2013.  His sentence in January 2014 called for 12 months' probation and 100 hours of community service.

2014 accident
On 4 August 2014, a StarTran bus was involved in a three-car accident.  The bus driver had to be extricated, and six people were injured.

2016 Transit Development Plan 
On November 1, 2016, StarTran implemented a new route structure from a Transit Development Plan. Almost all routes were reconfigured with the exception of University of Nebraska-Lincoln funded services. Three routes (13, 27, 44) now run all day until 9:55 PM with 30 minute headways on weekdays. Several changes occurred in December 2016, and more in January 2017 to refine the plan. Changes included removing the 46 Arnold Heights from being interlined, and creating a 3-way interline between routes 40 Heart Hospital, 42 Bethany, and 49 University Place due to on time performance issues with routes 40 & 49. Most routes now run until at least into the early evening hours.

Bus stops 
For the first time in its history, StarTran implemented a policy of only stopping at designated bus stops instead of its traditional flag stop system where customers could flag down a bus on any corner along the route. Stops have improved on time performance and driver/customer confusion on what an appropriate place to stop is.

Route interlines 
The following routes are interlined, meaning that at some point in their route they change into the other route listed.
 13 South 13th/27 North 27th-Interline at the Gold's Building.
 40 Heart Hospital/42 Bethany/49 University Place-Interline at the Gold's Building.
 41 Havelock/53 SouthPointe-Interline at the Gold's Building.
 48 North 48th/54 Veteran's Hospital-Interline at the Lincoln Veteran's Hospital and CHI Health St. Elizabeth Hospital.
 51 West A/52 Gaslight-Interline at the Gold's Building.

Criticism
StarTran does not operate on Sundays, and weekday service used to end early in the evening. During the summer of 2014, the 55 Star Shuttle was piloted to run until midnight on Thursday, Friday, & Saturday, but after low ridership on nights without events at Pinnacle Bank Arena, the service was not renewed after the 3-month trial ended.

All routes operate on a "spoke" arrangement from the downtown, adding to travel time for cross-town trips, and creating unnecessary detours for some routes, such as the former "27th Street Shuttle", which bypassed a densely populated neighborhood.

Operation
Mid America Coach, Inc. is a supplier of StarTran public transportation vehicles.

Fixed Route Ridership

The ridership and service statistics shown here are of fixed route services only and do not include demand response. Per capita statistics are based on the Lincoln urbanized area as reported in NTD data. Starting in 2011, 2010 census numbers replace the 2000 census numbers to calculate per capita statistics.

See also
 List of bus transit systems in the United States

References

External links
 City government website on StarTran
 History of StarTran
 Online Bus Tracker

Transportation in Lincoln, Nebraska
Bus transportation in Nebraska